Anna Rossinelli (born 20 April 1987 in Basel) is a Swiss singer-songwriter. Rossinelli sings as a part of a pop-soul trio band, which performs under her name.

Music career

Eurovision Song Contest

On 11 December 2010, Rossinelli won the Swiss national final (Die grosse Entscheidungs Show), with the song "In Love for a While" and represented the country at the Eurovision Song Contest 2011 in Düsseldorf, Germany.
On 10 May 2011, she joined the ESC in Düsseldorf in the first semifinal. She succeeded in entering the final only thanks to the jury vote. Switzerland ended up last there.

2011-present: Bon Voyage and present 
On 14 October 2011, Rossinelli released the lead single from her debut album "Joker". It was written by Phillipa Alexander, Ellie Wyatt, Alex Ball, Vicky Nolan. It was produced by Fred Herrmann. She released her debut album Bon Voyage on 9 December 2011.

On 6 March 2013, her next single was published. Let It Go is the first single from her upcoming album, Marylou which was released on 3 May 2013 and debuted at number one.

On 7 February 2014, Rossinelli re-release her album Marylou under the new title Marylou Two with the bonus tracks Shine In The Light, Let It Go (Live), Vagabonds (Live), Reconcile and Shine In The Light (Piano Version). The Swiss television studio SRF used the single Shine in the Light as their official song for the broadcast of the 2014 Winter Olympics.

Discography

Albums

Singles

References 

Living people
1987 births
Eurovision Song Contest entrants of 2011
21st-century Swiss women singers
Musicians from Basel-Stadt
Eurovision Song Contest entrants for Switzerland
Swiss-Italian people
Swiss singer-songwriters